Andrew Wenthe (born 1977) was the Iowa State Representative from the 18th District. He served in the Iowa House of Representatives from 2007 to 2013.  He received his BA from the University of Northern Iowa.

During his time in the House, Wenthe was a member of several of its committees: the Administration and Rules, Agriculture, Appropriations, State Government, and Transportation committees.  His prior political experience included serving as a legislative assistant for State Senator Jeff Danielson and as legislative staff for Senator Chuck Grassley.

In 2013, he was elected mayor of Fayette, Iowa, with his first term starting in 2014. As of January 2020, he remains mayor.

Electoral history
*incumbent

References

External links

 
 Wenthe official Iowa General Assembly site
Andrew Wenthe State Representative official constituency site
 

Democratic Party members of the Iowa House of Representatives
University of Northern Iowa alumni
Living people
Place of birth missing (living people)
1977 births